Meyronne is a special service area in the Canadian province of Saskatchewan.

History
Known history of the Wood Mountain area goes back to the trek by the NWMP in 1874 and the founding of the Wood Mountain Post  that same year. Land in the area was opened for homesteading in 1908. When the railway went through in 1913, the settlement moved to its present site.

It was reorganised from a village into a special service area on September 5, 2006.

Demographics 

Infrastructure 
Saskatchewan Transportation Company provides intercity bus service to Meyronne.

See also 
 List of communities in Saskatchewan
 List of hamlets in Saskatchewan

References 

Designated places in Saskatchewan
Former villages in Saskatchewan
Pinto Creek No. 75, Saskatchewan
Special service areas in Saskatchewan
Populated places disestablished in 2006
Division No. 3, Saskatchewan